Henry Adams (by 1532 – 1611), of Peterchurch in Pembroke, was a Welsh politician.

Family
Adams was a son of John Adams of Peterchurch and Catherine, daughter of Thomas ap Dafydd. Adams married Anne née Wogan, daughter of Richard Wogan of Boulston, Pembrokeshire. They had two sons including  the MP Nicholas Adams, and two daughters.

Career
He was a Member of Parliament (MP) in the Parliament of England for Pembroke Boroughs from March to October 1553.

References

Year of birth missing
1611 deaths
16th-century births
People from Pembroke, Pembrokeshire
16th-century Welsh politicians
Members of the Parliament of England (pre-1707) for constituencies in Wales
English MPs 1553 (Edward VI)
English MPs 1553 (Mary I)